Gyeryong station is a KTX station. It is on the Honam Line.

External links
 Cyber station information from Korail

Railway stations in South Chungcheong Province
Gyeryong
Railway stations opened in 1911
Korea Train Express stations